Betrayed is a 1954 American Eastmancolor war drama film directed by Gottfried Reinhardt and starring Clark Gable, Lana Turner, Victor Mature, and Louis Calhern. The screenplay was by Ronald Millar and George Froeschel. The musical score was by Walter Goehr and Bronislau Kaper, and the cinematography by Freddie Young. The picture, Gable's last for Metro-Goldwyn-Mayer, was filmed on location in the Netherlands and England, and was based on the story of turncoat Dutch resistance leader Christiaan Lindemans, also known as "King Kong". The supporting cast features O. E. Hasse, Wilfrid Hyde-White, Ian Carmichael, Niall MacGinnis, and Theodore Bikel. Betrayed was the fourth and final movie in which Gable played opposite Turner, and their third pairing set during World War II. (They played comrades, not simply lovers, in all three war films.)

Diana Coupland provided Turner's singing voice in the song "Johnny Come Home".

Betrayed was spoofed in the film Top Secret! (1984).

Plot
Betrayed is an espionage thriller set in the Nazi-occupied Netherlands during World War II, and revolves mostly around the Dutch resistance movement.

Colonel Pieter Deventer (Clark Gable) is an intelligence agent of the exiled Dutch government, working to liberate his homeland from Nazi occupiers. He divides his time between secret missions in the Netherlands and trips to England to consult his superiors and a British general. Deventer is ordered to keep an eye on singer Fran Seelers (Lana Turner), who's suspected of collaborating with the Germans. Both Deventer and Seelers join the shadowy Dutch underground, making contact with a flamboyant resistance leader known as "The Scarf" (Victor Mature).

As "Carla Van Oven", Seelers is assigned is to use her feminine charms to gain the confidence of Nazi officers and gather information. In one scene, resistance fighters burst into a lavish dinner party where Seelers is singing, and shoot Nazi officers. Within the next few weeks, however, a considerable number of underground operatives are captured and shot while carrying out ambushes and sabotage missions. It begins to look as though Deventer's suspicions about Seelers were correct, which weighs on his heart, because the two have fallen in love.

Ultimately, as Allied troops and the local resistance begin to turn the tide against the Nazis, "The Scarf" is revealed to be the real collaborator, and Deventer executes him. Seelers, who had loyally served the underground and almost been killed, turns up safe with British troops, and the two lovers are reunited.

Cast

 Clark Gable as Colonel Pieter Deventer
 Lana Turner as Carla Van Oven
 Victor Mature as "The Scarf"
 Louis Calhern as General Ten Eyck
 O. E. Hasse as Colonel Helmuth Dietrich
 Wilfrid Hyde-White as General Charles Larraby 
 Ian Carmichael as Captain Jackie Lawson
 Niall MacGinnis as "Blackie"
 Nora Swinburne as "The Scarf's" Mother
 Roland Culver as General Warsleigh
 Leslie Weston as "Pop"
 Christopher Rhodes as Chris
 Lily Kann as Jan's Grandmother 
 Brian Smith as Jan
 Anton Diffring as Captain Von Stanger
 Carl Jaffe as Major Plaaten
 Richard Anderson as 	John 
 Peter Martin as Freddy Jackson 
 Mona Washbourne as 	Waitress 
 Thomas Heathcote as 	Paratrooper Corporal 
 Glyn Houston as Paratrooper Corporal 
 Theodore Bikel as 	German Sergeant
 Wolf Frees as Motorcycle Rider 
 Ferdy Mayne as Luftwaffe Officer

Production

The film was at one stage known as The True and the Brave, with Kirk Douglas mentioned as a possible star. Richard Widmark was at one stage a forerunner for the part played by Victor Mature. Ava Gardner was to play the female lead, but was eventually replaced by Lana Turner.

Filming took place in late 1953 and early 1954, on location in Holland and England. Some shooting took place around Maastricht in Limburg. The interiors were shot at MGM's Elstree Studios near London. The film's sets were designed by the art director Alfred Junge.

It was the final film Gable made for MGM under his contract, which ended in March 1954. His next two films were released by 20th Century Fox.

Release

Box office
According to MGM records, the film earned $1,966,000 in the US and Canada, and $2,211,000 overseas, resulting in a profit of $821,000.

Critical reception
In a 1954 review in The New York Times, critic Bosley Crowther wrote: "By the time this picture gets around to figuring out whether the betrayer is Miss Turner or Mr. Mature, it has taken the audience through such a lengthy and tedious amount of detail that it has not only frayed all possible tension, but it has aggravated patience as well. Miss Turner and Mr. Gable have had many long-winded talks; Mr. Mature has thumped his chest like Tarzan and bellowed his boasts a score of times. An excess of espionage maneuvering has been laid out on the screen. The beauties of the countryside of the Netherlands have been looked at until they pall."

Home media
Betrayed was released on DVD and digital download on March 23, 2009, as part of the Warner Archive.

References

External links

1954 films
1954 romantic drama films
1950s spy drama films
1950s war drama films
American romantic drama films
American spy drama films
Films about Dutch resistance
Films directed by Gottfried Reinhardt
Films set in the Netherlands
Films shot in the Netherlands
Films set in England
Metro-Goldwyn-Mayer films
American war drama films
World War II spy films
Films scored by Walter Goehr
Films shot at MGM-British Studios
1950s English-language films
1950s American films